Jorge Matías Donoso Gárate (born July 8, 1986), known as Matías Donoso, is a Chilean footballer currently playing for O'Higgins of the Chilean Primera División.

Career
On second half 2015, Donoso played for Emirati club Al-Shaab in the UAE Pro League. Next he took his second challenge outside Chile after joining Patronato in the Argentine Primera División.

Honours
Unión Temuco
 Tercera A: 

Cobresal
 Chilean Primera División: 2015 Clausura

References

External links
 
 

1986 births
Living people
People from Temuco
Chilean footballers
Chilean expatriate footballers
Unión Temuco footballers
Santiago Wanderers footballers
Everton de Viña del Mar footballers
Cobresal footballers
Al-Shaab CSC players
Club Atlético Patronato footballers
Deportes Temuco footballers
Deportes Iquique footballers
O'Higgins F.C. footballers
Tercera División de Chile players
Chilean Primera División players
UAE Pro League players
Argentine Primera División players
Primera B de Chile players
Chilean expatriate sportspeople in the United Arab Emirates
Chilean expatriate sportspeople in Argentina
Expatriate footballers in the United Arab Emirates
Expatriate footballers in Argentina
Association football forwards